Amy Siemons (born 18 May 1985) is a Dutch wheelchair racer. Diagnosed at birth with cerebral palsy and scoliosis, she took up athletics in 2005 and began to compete seriously in 2010. Her disability classification is T34. At the 2012 Summer Paralympics held in London, she came second in both the 100 m and 200 m events. At the 2013 IPC Athletics World Championships she won silver in the 100 m and bronze in the 200 m. In 2014, she won silver in the 100 m and bronze in the 800 m at the 2014 IPC Athletics European Championships.

References

External links 
Personal website

Medalists at the 2012 Summer Paralympics
Athletes (track and field) at the 2012 Summer Paralympics
Dutch female wheelchair racers
Sportspeople from Eindhoven
1985 births
Dutch female sprinters
Living people
Paralympic silver medalists for the Netherlands
Medalists at the World Para Athletics Championships
Medalists at the World Para Athletics European Championships
Paralympic medalists in athletics (track and field)
Paralympic athletes of the Netherlands
Athletes (track and field) at the 2020 Summer Paralympics
21st-century Dutch women